Hurmiz Malik Chikko, also sometimes spelled Hormiz Malek Chikko, (1934 - December 2, 1963) was an Assyrian advocate and army leader. He led the Assyrian armed struggle against the ruling Ba'ath Party in Iraq from the late 1950s until his death in 1963 and promoted Assyrian autonomy in the Nineveh Plains during his life.

Early life and family
Chikko was born in 1934 in the village of Diana, Northern Iraq. He was the son of Malik Chikko of the clan of Dadosh, Upper Tyari, and the nephew of Malik Yaqo D’Malik Ismail, the leader of Upper Tyari Tribe. His older brother was Gewargis Malik Chikko, another Assyrian advocate who was the head of the High Committee of Christian affairs in Iraq and a founding member of the Chicago-branch of the Assyrian Universal Alliance.

Assyrian activism
Chikko commanded the Assyrian front against the Iraqi Ba’thist Regime in the late 1950s and early 1960s. His goals were to gain autonomy for Assyrians in Iraq, protect Assyrian and Yazidi lands in the northern Iraq from Arabization and Kurdification policies, and to protect the local Assyrian and Yazidi communities from the crossfire of the conflict between the Iraqi Central Government and Kurdish leadership.

Death
Chikko was killed in the Battle of Aloka on December 2, 1963 at the age of 29, along with six other Assyrian fighters. His death was thought by many to be a turning point that would allow for even more persecution of Assyrians in Kore Gavana, the Assyrian village that he lived in for most of his life. Kore Gavana, along with many other Assyrian-majority villages in Iraq's Dohuk Governorate, were eventually annexed by the Kurdistan Regional Government.

Legacy
Chikko is viewed by many Assyrians and Yazidis today as a martyr for their protection during a time of instability, as well as a martyr for the Assyrian nationalist cause. He and his family are mentioned in the Assyrian songs Chikko by Sargon Gabriel and Korehgawana by Juliana Jendo.

There was controversy among the international Assyrian community during the 2017 Kurdistan Region independence referendum, when an image of Chikko's statue in the village of Kore Gavana covered with Kurdish flags was surfaced. This was seen by many Assyrians as an attempt by the Kurdistan Regional Government to Kurdify Chikko's Assyrian nationalist legacy.

References 

 Assyrian nationalists
Assyrian military leaders
 Iraqi Assyrian people
 Iraqi Christians
 1934 births
 1963 deaths
Guerrillas killed in action